Pacoorcco (possibly from Quechua p'aqu blond, fair, a color similar to gold, urqu mountain, "'blond' or slightly golden mountain") erroneously also Poocoorco, is a  mountain in the Andes of Peru. The mountain is located in the Moquegua Region, General Sánchez Cerro Province, Ubinas District, north-east of the active volcano Ubinas and south of the mountain Pirhuane.

References

Mountains of Peru
Mountains of Moquegua Region